Stand-Up Confidential is a 1987 stand-up comedy special and the first starring Jerry Seinfeld It was then re-released on VHS in 1993 when the television show Seinfeld was gaining popularity.

Production
Some skit inserts were co-written by Joel Hodgson. The special aired on HBO on September 5, 1987 from The Improv at Los Angeles, California.

Cast
 Carl Reiner - Host (uncredited)
 Jerry Seinfeld - Himself
 Joel Hodgson - Cast Member
 Bernadette Birkett - Cast Member
 Jimmy Brogan - Cast Member
 John Carney - Cast Member
 Jann Karam - Cast Member
 Carol Leifer - Cast Member
 Larry Miller - Cast Member
 Suzy Ekerling - Kid in Classroom
 Hugh O'Neill - Kid in Classroom
 Tarrish Potter - Kid in Classroom
 Bo Sharon - Kid in Classroom

See also
Comedians in Cars Getting Coffee
Mystery Science Theater 3000

References

Jerry Seinfeld albums
1987 video albums
1993 video albums
Stand-up comedy concert films
1980s American television specials
Films scored by Kevin Kiner
HBO network specials
1990s English-language films
1980s English-language films